James Harrison (born 1914) was an English professional footballer who played as a winger. After beginning his career in Scotland with Hibernian, he joined Cardiff City in March 1937. He made one appearance for the club in a 1–1 draw with Bristol Rovers before being released. He later made 22 appearances for Rochdale during World War II, scoring 5 goals.

References

Date of death missing
English footballers
Hibernian F.C. players
Cardiff City F.C. players
Rochdale A.F.C. players
Scottish Football League players
English Football League players
Association football wingers
1914 births